Wutung (Udung) and Sangke (Nyao) are a Skou language or pair of languages of Papua New Guinea. It is spoken in the villages of Wutung and Sangke in Bewani/Wutung Onei Rural LLG of Sandaun Province. The two varieties are sometimes considered separate languages.

Tok Pisin and English are widely spoken in the area, and many Wutung people speak Indonesian too.

Location

Wutung village is in Sandaun Province, on the northern coast and adjacent to the border with Indonesia. There are about 500 living in Wutung village, most of whom speak Wutung.

The nearby villages of Musu (12 km east on the coast, at ) and Nyao Kono (about 12 km due south, at ) have closely related languages which are named after their villages (Musu and Nyao).  These three speech varieties are very closely related and are mutually intelligible.

Phonology

Wutung has fifteen consonants and seven vowels, six of which have nasal variants. This gives a total of 28 phonemes. Wutung also makes suprasegmental distinctions in tone.

Consonants
Wutung is one of the very few languages that lack velar consonants.

Vowels

Wutung has thirteen vowels, which includes seven oral and six nasal vowels. The table below shows the oral vowels. Each of these vowels, apart from the close-mid vowel ur /ɵ/, has an equivalent nasal vowel. The nasal vowels are indicated using the same symbol as the equivalent oral, but with a following ng, e.g. ca, 'pig' vs. cang 'blossom', the latter having the nasal vowel.

Pronouns

Wutung has a simple system of personal pronouns with three persons (1st, 2nd and 3rd), two numbers (singular and plural) and gender in the third person singular pronouns. The same set of pronouns are used for object and subject.

{| class=wikitable
|-
| I || nie || we || netu
|-
| thou || me || you || etu
|-
| he || qey || they || tetu
|-
| she || cey
|}

External links 
 Paradisec has an open access collection of Don Laycock’s materials that includes Zimakani language materials

References

 

Languages of Sandaun Province
Western Skou languages